Ellie is a 1984 comedy film directed by Peter Wittman and distributed by Troma Entertainment. Set in the Deep South, the film follows the titular barefoot Ellie (Sheila Kennedy); after witnessing her father's murder at the hands of her stepmother and her three lecherous stepbrothers, Ellie vows to avenge her father's death using the only weapon she has: her voluptuous body.
The film also features appearances from such noteworthy actors as Shelley Winters, George Gobel, Edward Albert and Pat Paulsen.

External links
 

1984 films
American independent films
Troma Entertainment films
1984 comedy films
1984 independent films
Films set in the Southern United States
1980s English-language films
1980s American films